The Village Thing was an independent record label in the United Kingdom which published folk rock, blues and acoustic music between 1970 and 1973, under the tag of "The Alternative Folk Label".

History
The company, based at The Barton, Inglestone Common, Badminton, Gloucestershire, rose from the thriving Bristol contemporary folk scene based around the Clifton area and centred on the Bristol Troubadour Club. Specialising in local acts, it took the music to a wider audience and was highly influential in the development of British folk and blues based music in the 1970s and after. Records were pressed in relatively small numbers and a cult following has resulted in them becoming highly collectable. Typical pressings were about 2,000 copies, but their best seller, "The Folker" by Fred Wedlock sold some 20,000. Village Thing was founded by Gef Lucena, Ian A. Anderson and John Turner. Lucena was already running a local indie label, Saydisc, which had already gained a reputation for publishing low-run pressings by local folk/comedy artists including Fred Wedlock; Saydisc was the "parent" company and continues to trade today. Anderson had become well known for his part in the "White Blues Boom" of the late 1960s and had recorded for Fontana both solo and with Mike Cooper. turn, The Pigsty Hill Light Orchestra. Village Thing records were distributed by Transatlantic Records.
The company logo was design ed by Rodney Matthews, as were some of the album covers; Matthews later became very well known for his fantasy art and produced album covers for major artists including Thin Lizzy, Magnum and Rick Wakeman.

Availability
Some of The Village Thing albums have been reissued as CDs on labels including Scenesof (US); Castle, The Weekend Beatnik, Saydisc and Sunbeam (UK); Riverman (Korea); and Vinyl Japan.

Discography

Albums (12 inch vinyl)
VTS 1	Phlop!  Pigsty Hill Light Orchestra
VTS 2	The Sun Also Rises, The Sun Also Rises
VTS 3	Royal York Crescent, Ian A. Anderson	
VTS 4	The Legendary Me, Wizz Jones
VTS 5	An Acoustic Confusion, Steve Tilston	
VTS 6	The Words In Between, Dave Evans	
VTS 7	The Folker, Fred Wedlock	
VTS 8	Piggery Jokery, Pigsty Hill Light Orchestra	
VTS 9	A Vulture Is Not A Bird You Can Trust, Ian A. Anderson	
VTS 10	Mudge And Clutterbuck, Mudge And Clutterbuck (unreleased)
VTS 11	Magic Landscape, Hunt and Turner	
VTS 12	Hokum, Tight Like That	
VTS 13	Tucker Zimmerman, Tucker Zimmerman
VTS 14	Elephantasia, Dave Evans	
VTSAM 15 Us (Various artist)	
VTSAM 16 Matchbox Days (Various artists)	
VTS 17	Feelin’ Fine, Derroll Adams	
VTS 18	Singer Sleeps On As Blaze Rages, Ian A. Anderson	
VTS 19	Jonesville,	Al Jones
VTS 20	Frollicks, Fred Wedlock	
VTS 21	Chris Thompson, Chris Thompson	
VTS 22 Peabody Hotel, Dave Peabody	
VTS 23	Junk Store Songs For Sale, Lackey and Sweeney	
VTS 24	When I Leave Berlin, Wizz Jones	
VTS 25	Murf, Noel Murphy

Singles / Extended Play (7 inch vinyl)
VTSX 1000	"The Great White Dap" EP - Various Artists (Wizz Jones/The Sun Also Rises/Ian A. Anderson/Pigsty Hill Light Orchestra)		
VTSX 1001	"Cut Across Shorty / Shake That Thing" - Strange Fruit	
VTSX 1002	"One More Chance / Policeman’s Ball" - Ian A. Anderson	

VTS7, VTS17 and VTS18 were also released on cassette and 8-track cartridge

References

External links
Village Thing MySpace page
Saydisc Records
Bristol Folk provides a discographical history of many of the artists that recorded for Village Thing and also includes a partial history of the label
The Saydisc & Village Thing Discography includes a complete discography for Village Thing, including pictures of all sleeves and label designs. It is rounded off with a history of Village Thing

British record labels
Folk record labels
Blues record labels
Record labels established in 1970